China is the world's largest producer of potatoes, generating more than 22 percent of global potato production. The potato is the only crop that can be grown in all regions of China, although cultivation predominantly takes place in the northern and southern regions of the country.

History
Potato production in China had already been on the rise in the 1960s and early 1970s, following the Great Chinese Famine. A dramatic surge in the production of potatoes in 1993 against a slump in European output propelled China to the forefront of the international potato production scene. The tremendous surge of potato production during the 1990s has been credited to technological advancements. 21st-century production of potatoes in China has fallen considerably though, largely due to growth sites becoming less suitable and hence diminishing the sustainability of potato cultivation, alongside the increasing prioritisation of other crops and produce over potatoes. Efforts from 2004 onwards started to focus on the organic production of potatoes; the first organic potato enterprise originated in Heilongjiang, while Wuchuan County, which has good water, weather and a culture of using organic fertilisers, is the largest of all the organic potato producers in China. In a speech in 2015, China's vice minister of agriculture Yu Xinrong said "Hunger breeds discontentment. … The development of the potato industry and the consumption of potatoes as a staple food is an important step in China’s agricultural development".

Production

The potato is a tuber crop which has high nutritional value. It has protein, calcium and vitamin C. One potato of medium size contains 50 percent of the daily vitamin C needs of an adult. When boiled, its protein content is reported to be more than that of maize, with double the calcium content. 

The potato is the only crop that is plantable in all regions of China, although the country has four main potato-planting regions: North China (Heilongjiang, Jilin, Liaoning, Inner Mongolia, Hebei, Shanxi, Shaanxi, Ningxia, Gansu, Qinghai and Xinjiang), which makes up around 47 percent of the total planting area in the country; Central China (Liaoning, Hebei, Shanxi, Shaanxi, Hubei, Hunan, Henan, Shandong, Jiangsu, Zhejiang, Anhui and Jiangxi), contributing towards 7 percent of the total planting area; South China (Guangxi, Guangdong, Hainan, Fujian and Taiwan), 8 percent; and Southwest China (Yunnan, Guizhou, Sichuan, Chongqing, Tibet, Hubei and Hunan), 38 percent.

However, the average yield of potatoes in China was 14.35 tons/ha, compared to the global mean of 16.74 tons/ha.

Over the past decade, the planted area of potatoes in China has been growing because of the important role of potatoes in poverty reduction and food security, not to mention the greater economic returns of selling potatoes vis-a-vis other crops.

Apart from sub-par seed qualities and economic expectations, pests and fungal diseases, including late blight, have devastatingly limited the production of potatoes in China; this, however, has prompted intense research on ways to combat them.

Cuisine
Potatoes are an integral part of the Chinese diet, especially in rural parts of China. Potatoes in China are also increasingly being used to make potato crisps and french fries, especially with the country's burgeoning fast food and processed food industries.

See also
 Agriculture in China

References

Bibliography
 

Agricultural production in China by commodity
China